The Battle of Borneo was a successful campaign by Japanese Imperial forces for control of Borneo island and concentrated mainly on the subjugation of the Raj of Sarawak, Brunei, North Borneo, and the western part of Kalimantan that was part of the Dutch East Indies. The Japanese main unit for this mission was the 35th Infantry Brigade led by Major General Kiyotake Kawaguchi.

Background

In 1941, Borneo was divided between the Dutch East Indies and British protectorates (North Borneo, Sarawak and Brunei) and crown colonies (Labuan).

The so-called "White Rajahs", the Brooke family, had ruled Sarawak, on the northwest of Borneo, for almost a century, first as Rajahs under the Sultanate of Brunei (a by then tiny but once powerful state entirely enclosed within the borders of Sarawak), and from 1888 as a protectorate of the British Empire. The northeast of the island comprised North Borneo, since 1882 another British protectorate under the British North Borneo Company. Offshore lay the small British crown colony of Labuan.

The rest of the island—collectively known as Kalimantan—was under Dutch control. The Netherlands were invaded by Nazi Germany in 1940. However, Free Dutch forces—mainly the Royal Netherlands Navy and the 85,000-strong Royal Netherlands East Indies Army (KNIL, including a small air service)—fought on, spread throughout the Dutch East Indies, and by December 1941 under an embryonic and somewhat chaotic joint Allied command which became the short-lived American-British-Dutch-Australian Command (ABDACOM).

The Tripartite Pact—between the three Axis powers of Germany, Japan and Italy—guaranteed mutual support, and this paid off for Japan in July 1941 when French weakness in the wake of the fall of France to Germany allowed Japan to occupy French Indo-China (now modern Vietnam, Laos and Cambodia). This blocked a supply route for the Kuomintang, against whom Japan had been fighting since 1937, the Second Sino-Japanese War. It also gave Imperial Japan a seaboard facing Sarawak and North Borneo across the China Sea. In December 1941, Japan attacked US possessions in Hawaii and the Philippines, declaring war on the US and finally precipitating Germany's official declaration of war on America, according to the Pact.

With its rich petroleum exploitation capacity, for instance at Tarakan, Balikpapan and Banjarmasin, Borneo was a prime target for Japan, and a very poorly guarded one. Chronically short of natural resources, Japan needed an assured supply of fuel to achieve its long-term goal of becoming the major power in the Pacific. Borneo also stood on the main sea routes between Java, Sumatra, Malaya and Celebes. Control of these routes were vital to securing the territory.

Order of Battle

Allied

Defence in Sarawak and North Borneo
The main objectives were the oilfields at Miri in Sarawak region and Seria in Brunei. The oil was refined at Lutong near Miri. Despite rich oil supplies, the Sarawak region had no air or sea forces to defend it. Only in late 1940 did Air Chief Marshal Sir Robert Brooke-Popham order the 2nd Battalion, 15th Punjab Regiment, a heavy 152 mm (6 in) gun battery from the Hong Kong-Singapore Royal Artillery, and a detachment of the 35th Fortress Company (Royal Engineers) to be positioned at Kuching. They numbered about 1,050 men. In addition, the Brooke White Rajah government also organised the Sarawak Rangers. This force consisted of 1,515 men who were primarily Iban and Dayak tribesmen. Altogether these forces were commanded by British Lieutenant Colonel C.M. Lane and was known as "SARFOR" (Sarawak Force).

After having heard of the attack on Pearl Harbor, on 8 December 1941, the Brooke government ordered that the oilfields at Miri and Seria and refinery at Lutong be quickly demolished.

Defence in Singkawang and Pontianak (Dutch East Indies)
The Dutch forces had an important airfield near the border of British Malaysia (Sarawak) called "Singkawang II", which was defended by about 750 Dutch troops. On 25 November, five Brewster 339 Buffalo fighter planes arrived for local defence, followed in the beginning of December by Martin B-10 bombers.

The Dutch Naval Aviation Group GVT-1, with three Dornier Do 24K flying boats, was located in Pontianak along with a KNIL garrison, commanded by Lieutenant Colonel Dominicus Mars, numbering approximately 500 men.

Dutch forces in West Borneo consisted of the following units:
 West Borneo KNIL Garrison Battalion
 Stadswacht Infantry Company (about 125 men) in Pontianak
 Anti-Aircraft Battery (two  guns) plus some AA machine-guns
 Mobile Auxiliary First Aid Platoon
 Stadswacht Detachment (about 50 men) in Singkawang
 Stadswacht Detachment (unknown strength) in Sintang

Imperial Japanese

The main Japanese force—led by Major General Kiyotake Kawaguchi—consisted of units from Canton, southern China:
 35th Infantry Brigade Headquarters
 124th Infantry Regiment from Japanese 18th Division
 2nd Yokosuka Naval Landing Force
 4th Naval Construction Unit
 1 platoon of the 12th Engineer Regiment
 1 unit from the 18th Division Signal Unit
 1 unit from the 18th Division Medical Unit
 4th Field Hospital, 18th Division
 1 unit from the 11th Water Supply and Purification Unit

Battle

On 13 December 1941, a Japanese invasion convoy left Cam Ranh Bay in French Indochina, escorted by the cruiser  (Rear-Admiral Shintaro Hashimoto), the destroyers of the 12th Destroyer Division (and ), the submarine chaser CH-7, and the seaplane tender Kamikawa Maru. Ten transport ships (Imperial Japanese Army transports , Hiyoshi Maru, Myoho Maru, Kenkon Maru, Nichiran Maru; and Imperial Japanese Navy transports Hokkai Maru, Tonan Maru No 3, Unyo Maru No. 2, Kamikawa Maru, Mitakesan Maru) carried the Japanese 35th Infantry Brigade HQ under the command of Major General Kiyotake Kawaguchi.

Part of the Japanese force was allocated to capture Miri and Seria, while the rest would capture Kuching and nearby airfields. The convoy escaped detection and, at dawn on 16 December 1941, two landing units secured Miri and Seria, encountering very little resistance from British forces. A few hours later, Lutong was captured as well.

Dutch Martin B-10 bombers attacked Japanese shipping from their base, 'Singkawang II' at Miri, on 17 December, but their attempt failed. The three Dornier Do 24Ks followed up with their own attack, but one was shot down, possibly by a floatplane from Kamikawa Maru. The remaining two, benefiting from cloud cover, were never seen by the Japanese. The destroyer's stern broke off and the ship sank within minutes. The last flying boat dropped its bombs on a freighter, but missed. The B-10 bombers made attacks at Miri 18 and 19 December, but retired to Sumatra on 23 December since Singkawang II airfield was discovered by the Japanese, who began attacking it the same day.

On 22 December, a Japanese convoy left Miri for Kuching, but was spotted by the Dutch flying boat X-35, which radioed a warning to the Dutch submarine , under the command of Lieutenant Commander Carel A. J. van Groeneveld. At 20:40 on 23 December, K XIV infiltrated the convoy and began its attack. The army transports Hiyoshi Maru and Katori Maru were sunk with the loss of hundreds of troops.  was beached to prevent her from sinking, and another transport was less seriously damaged. The rest of the troops were able to land. Although 2nd Battalion, 15th Punjab Regiment, resisted the attack, they were soon outnumbered and retreated up the river. By the afternoon, Kuching was in Japanese hands.

K XVI was lost with all hands during the day by a torpedo from Japanese submarine I66.

On 24 and 28 December, B-10 bombers from a different unit flew missions against Kuching from Singapore, Sembawang. On 26 December, B-10s operating out of Samarinda sank a Japanese minesweeper and a collier.

Meanwhile, on 31 December 1941, the force under Lieutenant Colonel Watanabe moved northward to occupy Brunei, Labuan Island, and Jesselton (now called Kota Kinabalu). On 18 January 1942, using small fishing boats, the Japanese landed at Sandakan, the seat of government of British North Borneo. The North Borneo Armed Constabulary, with only 650 men, hardly provided any resistance to slow down the Japanese invasion. On the morning of 19 January, Governor Charles Robert Smith surrendered British North Borneo and was interned with other staff.

At about 16:40 on 25 December, Japanese troops successfully captured Kuching airfield. The Punjab regiment retreated through the jungle to the Singkawang area. After Singkawang was secured as well on 29 December, the rest of the British and Dutch troops retreated southward further into the jungle, trying to reach Sampit and Pangkalanbun, where a Dutch airfield at Kotawaringin was located. South and central Kalimantan were taken by the Japanese Navy following attacks from east and west. The town of Pontianak was finally occupied by the Imperial Japanese forces on 29 January 1942. After ten weeks in the jungle-covered mountains, Allied troops surrendered on 1 April 1942.

References
 Runciman, S., The White Rajahs: A History of Sarawak from 1841 to 1946, particularly 252–5. Cambridge University Press, 1960.
 Percival, Arthur Ernest The War in Malaya, (especially Chapter XII: Operations in Borneo.) London, Eyre & Spottiswoode, 1949.
 L., Klemen, 1999–2000, The Netherlands East Indies 1941–42, " The Invasion of British Borneo in 1942".
 L., Klemen, 1999–2000, The Netherlands East Indies 1941–42, " The Japanese occupation of Sandakan, January 1942".
 Governors of North Borneo, World Statesmen.

Citations

Battle of Borneo (1941-42)
Battle of Borneo (1941-42)
Battle of Borneo (1941-42)
Battle of Borneo (1941-42)
Battle of Borneo (1941-42)
.
South West Pacific theatre of World War II
Borneo (1941-42)
Borneo (1941-42)
Land battles and operations of World War II involving the United Kingdom
Military history of Malaya during World War II
Battle of Borneo (1941-42)
1941 in British Malaya
1942 in British Malaya
1941 in the Dutch East Indies
1942 in the Dutch East Indies
1941 in the Japanese colonial empire
1942 in the Japanese colonial empire
Conflicts in 1941
Conflicts in 1942
Battle of Borneo (1941-42)
Battle of Borneo (1941-42)
Battle of Borneo (1941-42)
World War II operations and battles of the Pacific theatre
December 1941 events
January 1942 events
February 1942 events
March 1942 events